Valeriya Ilyinichna Novodvorskaya (17 May 1950 – 12 July 2014) was a Soviet dissident, writer and liberal politician. She was the founder and the chairwoman of the Democratic Union party and a member of the editorial board of The New Times.

Biography
Novodvorskaya was born in 1950 in Baranavichy, Byelorussian SSR to a Jewish engineer, Ilya Borisovich (Boruchovich) Burshtyn, and a pediatrician, Nina Feodorovna Novodvorskaya, who came from a noble Russian family. Her parents divorced in 1967; Ilya Borisovich later emigrated to North America.

Novodvorskaya was active in the Soviet dissident movement since her youth, and first imprisoned by the Soviet authorities in 1969, when she was 19, for distributing leaflets that criticized the Soviet invasion of Czechoslovakia. The leaflets included her poetry about the Soviet Communist Party:
...
Thank you Party
For all the falsehood and lies,
For all the denunciations and informers,
For the shots in Prague’s square,
For all the lies you’ve yet to tell.

For the paradise of factories and of flats,
All built on crimes in the torture
Chambers of yesterday and today
And for our broken and black world.

Thank you Party
For our bitterness and despair,
For our shameful silence,
Thank you Party.
...

She was arrested and imprisoned at a Soviet psychiatric hospital and, like many other Soviet dissidents, diagnosed with "sluggish schizophrenia". In the early 1990s, psychiatrists of the Independent Psychiatric Association of Russia proved that the claim of her mental illness was bogus. She described her experience in her book Beyond Despair.

Based on the materials of the case, the Moscow prosecutor's office of the USSR compiled the following certificate (revealed only in 1999):

Novodvorskaya stood as a Democratic Union candidate in the 1993 Russian legislative election in a single-mandate district as part of the Russia's Choice bloc, and she also contested the 1995 Russian legislative election on the list of the Party of Economic Freedom. She was not elected in either election, and never held public office.

In 2009, Novodvorskaya published an autobiographical book, Farewell of Slavianka.

Views

Novodvorskaya self-identified primarily as a liberal politician and was described by her colleagues as "a critic of Russian realities in the best traditions of Pyotr Chaadayev, Vissarion Belinsky and Alexander Herzen". She was strongly critical of Chechen Wars, Vladimir Putin's domestic policies, and the rebirth of Soviet propaganda in Russia. Her consistent criticism of Russia's past and present, of political and social life, as well as her extravagant lifestyle granted her titles such as "the eternal dissident" and "an idealist at the edge of madness".

According to Novodvorskaya, it was Russian governmental policies in Chechnya that turned Basayev into a terrorist. In response, Alexei Venediktov, the editor-in-chief of the liberal radio station Echo of Moscow, banned her from the appearing on their programs.

Novodvorskaya also accused the Russian government of murdering Polish president Lech Kaczyński in a plane crash on 10 April 2010 in Smolensk Oblast.

Aleksandr Dugin, Igor Shafarevich, Sergey Kara-Murza, Yevgeny Dodolev, Vladimir Bushin and a few others accused Novodvorskaya of expressing anti-Russian views and condemning Russian history while idealizing the Western civilization and the United States.

On 27 January 1995, the Office of the Prosecutor-General launched a Novodvorskaya Case in reaction to her interview given to Estonian journalists on 6 April 1994 where she stated that she "cannot imagine how can anyone love a Russian for his laziness, for his lying, for his poverty, for his spinelessness, for his slavery", as well as several publications in Novy Vzglyad and other periodicals. According to prosecution, she denigrated rights of Russians in Estonia and claimed that "manic depression" was the major trait of Russian people which defined all their national history.

All materials were checked for "propaganda of civil war", "of inferiority of people based on their ethnicity" and "incitement to hatred". Henri Reznik who defended her in court insisted that Novodvorkaya had only expressed her opinion "similarly to Pyotr Chaadayev, Nikolai Gogol, Alexander Pushkin and Vladimir Lenin". The case lasted for two years and was closed in June 1997 for the "lack of crime". However Novy Vzglyad stopped publishing her articles, and its founder Yevgeny Dodolev later dedicated a critical book to Novodvorskaya and her case.

Personal life
Throughout her life, Novodvorskaya lived in a flat with her mother Nina Fyodorovna (Нина Федоровна Новодворская, 1928–2017), a pediatrician, and cat Stasik. In the summers, they rented a dacha in Kratovo. She was fond of swimming, science fiction, theater and cats.

In 1990, Novodvorskaya was baptized by the noncanonical Ukrainian Autocephalous Orthodox Church Reunited. She belonged to that church till her death while remaining highly critical of the KGB-controlled Russian Orthodox Church. According to her priest Yakov Krotov, "she was more of a Christian than I ever was".

Death 
On 12 July 2014, Novodvorskaya died of toxic shock syndrome, which arose from phlegmon of the left foot.

Awards
Novodvorskaya received the Galina Starovoitova Award "for contribution to the defense of human rights and strengthening democracy in Russia". She said at the ceremony that "we are not in opposition to, but in confrontation with, the present regime".

She was awarded the Knight's Cross of the Order of the Lithuanian Grand Duke Gediminas in 2008.

Bibliography
Novodvorskaya published several books that are supplemented with the publications from Novy Vzglyad newspaper:
 Beyond Despair (Novosti, 1993) 
 Карфаген обязан быть разрушен (The Carthage Must Be Destroyed) 
 Валерия Новодворская. Над пропастью во лжи (The Catcher in the Lie) (both titles are puns on The Catcher in the Rye) 
 Валерия Новодворская. Прощание славянки (Farewell of Slav) (Захаров, 2009 г) 
 Валерия Новодворская. Поэты и цари (Poets and Kings) (Аct, Аct Москва, Харвест, 2009 г)

References

External links 

  
 Opinions on grani.ru 
 
 Novodvorskaya fund and Video Archive 

1950 births
2014 deaths
People from Baranavichy
Russian anti-communists
Russian dissidents
Russian people of Belarusian-Jewish descent
Russian political activists
Russian politicians
21st-century Russian women politicians
Soviet dissidents
Russian non-fiction writers
Russian political writers
20th-century Russian writers
21st-century Russian writers
Russian memoirists
Women memoirists
20th-century Russian women writers
21st-century Russian women writers
Inmates of Lefortovo Prison
Eastern Orthodox Christians from Russia
Recipients of the Order of the Lithuanian Grand Duke Gediminas
20th-century Russian women politicians